A professional golfer is somebody who receives payments or financial rewards in the sport of golf that are directly related to their skill or reputation. A person who earns money by teaching or playing golf is traditionally considered a "golf pro," most of whom are teachers/coaches. The professional golfer status is reserved for people who play, rather than teach, golf for a career.

In golf, the distinction between amateurs and professionals is rigorously maintained. An amateur who breaches the rules of amateur status may lose their amateur status. A golfer who has lost their amateur status may not play in amateur competitions until amateur status has been reinstated; a professional may not play in amateur tournaments unless the Committee is notified, acknowledges and confirms the participation. It is very difficult for a professional to regain their amateur status; simply agreeing not to take payment for a particular tournament is not enough. A player must apply to the governing body of the sport to have amateur status reinstated.

History
Historically, the distinction between amateur and professional golfers had much to do with social class. In 18th and 19th century Britain, golf was played by the rich, for pleasure. The early professionals were working-class men who made a living from the game in a variety of ways: caddying, greenkeeping, clubmaking, and playing challenge matches. When golf arrived in America at the end of the 19th century, it was an elite sport there, too. Early American golf clubs imported their professionals from Britain. It was not possible to make a living solely from playing tournament golf until some way into the 20th century (Walter Hagen is sometimes considered to have been the first man to have done so).

In the developed world, the class distinction is now almost entirely irrelevant. Golf is affordable at public courses to a large portion of the population, and most golf professionals are from middle-class backgrounds, which are often the same sort of backgrounds as the members of the clubs where they work or the people they teach the game, and educated to university level. Leading tournament golfers are very wealthy; upper class in the modern U.S. usage of the term. However, in some developing countries, there is still a class distinction. Often golf is restricted to a much smaller and more elite section of society than is the case in countries like the United States and the United Kingdom. Professional golfers from these countries are quite often from poor backgrounds and start their careers as caddies, for example, Ángel Cabrera of Argentina, and Zhang Lian-wei who is the first significant tournament professional from the People's Republic of China.
In various countries, Professional Golfers' Associations (PGAs) serve either or both of these categories of professionals. There are separate LPGAs (Ladies Professional Golf Associations) for women.

Rules
Under the rules of golf and amateur status, except for hole in one prizes, the maximum value of a prize an amateur can accept is £500, or $750. If an amateur accepts a prize of greater than this they forfeit their amateur status, and are therefore by definition a professional golfer.

Professional golfers are divided into two main groups, with a limited amount of overlap between them:

The great majority of professional golfers make their living from teaching the game, running golf clubs and courses, and dealing in golf equipment. In golf pro refers to individuals involved in the service of other golfers. The senior professional golfer at a golf club is usually referred to as the club professional, but at a large golf club or resort with several courses his job title is likely to be director of golf. If they have assistants who are registered professional golfers, they are known as assistant professionals. A golfer who concentrates wholly or nearly so on giving golf lessons is a teaching professional, golf instructor or golf coach. Most of these people will enter a few tournaments against their peers each year, and occasionally they may qualify to play in important tournaments with the other group of professional golfers mentioned below. Many club and teaching professionals working in the golf industry start as caddies, or a general interest in the game, finding employment at golf courses and eventually moving on to certifications in their chosen profession. These programs include independent institutions and universities, and those that eventually lead to a Class A golf professional certification.
 Note that the USGA defines "instruction" strictly as teaching the physical aspects of golf. Instruction in the psychological aspects of the game is explicitly excluded from this definition.
A much smaller but higher profile group of professional golfers earn a living from playing in golf tournaments, or aspire to do so. Their income comes from prize money, and sometimes, even endorsements. These individuals are referred to as tournament pros, tour professionals, or pro golfers.

PGA of America
In the United States, the PGA of America  has 31 distinct member classifications for professionals. Many of the classifications also have corresponding apprenticeship positions.

See also
Lists of golfers - lists of professional (and amateur) golfers
PGA Tour

References

External links

The Professional Golfers' Association (Great Britain and Ireland)
PGA of America

 
Golf terminology
Sports occupations and roles
Golf people